Donald Sylvester is an American sound editor who has worked on over 100 films. He is best known for his work with James Mangold on the films Ford v Ferrari (2019), Logan (2017), 3:10 to Yuma (2007), and Walk the Line (2005). Sylvester won the Academy Award for Best Sound Editing at the 92nd Academy Awards for Ford v Ferrari and BAFTA Award for Best Sound at the 59th British Academy Film Awards for Walk the Line. He has been a member of BAFTA since 2007.

Awards and nominations
 2020: Academy Award for Best Sound Editing – Ford v Ferrari (won)
 2020: BAFTA Award for Best Sound – Ford v Ferrari (nominated)
 2020: Golden Reel Award for Outstanding Achievement in Sound Editing – Sound Effects and Foley for Feature Film – Ford v Ferrari (won)
 2020: Golden Reel Award for Outstanding Achievement in Sound Editing – Dialogue and ADR for Feature Film – Ford v Ferrari (nominated)
 2020: Satellite Award for Best Sound – Ford v Ferrari (won)
 2019: Hollywood Film Award for Sound of the Year – Ford v Ferrari (won)
 2018: Golden Reel Award for Outstanding Achievement in Sound Editing – Sound Effects and Foley for Feature Film – Logan (nominated)
 2008: Golden Reel Award for Outstanding Achievement in Sound Editing – Sound Effects and Foley for Feature Film – 3:10 to Yuma (nominated)
 2006: BAFTA Award for Best Sound – Walk the Line (won)
 2004: Golden Reel Award for Outstanding Achievement in Sound Editing – Dialogue and ADR for Feature Film – Master and Commander: The Far Side of the World (nominated)
 2004: Golden Reel Award for Outstanding Achievement in Sound Editing – Dialogue and ADR for Feature Film – X2: X-Men United (nominated)
 2003: Golden Reel Award for Outstanding Achievement in Sound Editing – Dialogue and ADR for Feature Film – Antwone Fisher (nominated)
 2001: Golden Reel Award for Outstanding Achievement in Sound Editing – Sound Effects and Foley for Feature Film – U-571 (nominated)

References

External links
 

Living people
American sound editors
People from Moorestown, New Jersey
Best Sound Editing Academy Award winners
Best Sound BAFTA Award winners
Year of birth missing (living people)